Laurence Courtois (born 18 January 1976) is a former professional female tennis player from Belgium.

Courtois, who was born in Kortrijk, won four doubles titles on the WTA Tour during her career.

WTA Tour finals

Singles 2

Doubles 9 (4–5)

ITF finals

Singles: 5 (3–2)

Doubles: 16 (13-3)

External links
 
 

1976 births
Living people
Belgian female tennis players
Flemish sportspeople
French Open junior champions
Olympic tennis players of Belgium
Sportspeople from Kortrijk
Tennis players at the 1996 Summer Olympics
Wimbledon junior champions
Grand Slam (tennis) champions in girls' doubles